The North Atlantic right whale (Eubalaena glacialis) is a baleen whale, one of three right whale species belonging to the genus Eubalaena, all of which were formerly classified as a single species. Because of their docile nature, their slow surface-skimming feeding behaviors, their tendencies to stay close to the coast, and their high blubber content (which makes them float when they are killed, and which produced high yields of whale oil), right whales were once a preferred target for whalers.
At present, they are among the most endangered whales in the world, and they are protected under the U.S. Endangered Species Act and Marine Mammal Protection Act and Canada's Species at Risk Act. There are fewer than 370 individuals in existence in the western North Atlantic Ocean—they migrate between feeding grounds in the Labrador Sea and their winter calving areas off Georgia and Florida, an ocean area with heavy shipping traffic. In the eastern North Atlantic, on the other hand—with a total population reaching into the low teens at most—scientists believe that they may already be functionally extinct. Vessel strikes and entanglement in fixed fishing gear, which together account for nearly half of all North Atlantic right whale mortality since 1970, are their two greatest threats to recovery.

Description 

Like other right whales, the North Atlantic right whale, also known as the northern right whale or black right whale, is readily distinguished from other cetaceans by the absence of a dorsal fin on its broad back, short, paddle-like pectoral flippers and a long arching mouth that begins above the eye. Its coloration is dark grey to black, with some individuals occasionally having white patches on their stomachs or throats. Other unique features include a large head, which makes up a quarter of its total body length, narrow tail stock in comparison to its wide fluke and v-shaped blowhole which produces a heart-shaped blow.

The most distinguishing feature for right whales is their callosities, rough, white patches of keratinized skin found on their heads.  The right whale's callosities provide habitat for large colonies of cyamids or whale lice, which feed on the right whale's skin as these small crustaceans cannot survive in open water. The relationship between cyamids and right whales is symbiotic in nature but is poorly understood by scientists. Callosities are not caused by the external environment and are present on fetuses before birth. However, Cyamids near the blowhole have been linked to chronic entanglement and other injuries; their presence in this area has been used as measure of individual health in visual health assessments.

Females are larger than males.

Up to forty-five percent of a right whale's body weight is blubber. This high percentage causes their body to float after death due to the low density of blubber.

There is little data on their lifespan, but it is believed to be at least 70 years although individuals in species closely related to right whales have been found to live more than 100 years. Currently, female North Atlantic Right whales live on average 45 years and males 65 years. Age of right whales can be determined by examining their earwax postmortem.

Behavior

Surface activities 

Aside from mating activities performed by groups of single female and several males, so called SAG (Surface Active Group), North Atlantic right whales seem less active compared to subspecies in southern hemisphere. However, this could be due to intense difference in number of surviving individuals especially calves that tend to be more curious and playful than adults, and small amount of observations. They are also known to interact with other baleen whales especially with Humpback whales or Bottlenose dolphins.

Vocalization 
North Atlantic right whales recordings are available online. Many effective automated methods, such as signal processing, data mining, and machine learning techniques are used to detect and classify their calls.

Reproduction 
North Atlantic right whales are promiscuous breeders. They first give birth at age nine or ten after a year-long gestation; the interval between births seems to have increased since the 1990s, and now averages three to six years.

Feeding 
Right whales feed mainly on copepods and other small invertebrates such as krill, pteropods, and larval barnacles, generally by slowly skimming through patches of concentrated prey at or below the ocean surface. Sei whales and basking sharks (sometimes minke whales as well) are in positions as food competitors and are known to feed in the same areas, swimming next to each other, but there have not been any conflicts observed between these species.

Taxonomy 

The whale's scientific name is Eubalaena glacialis, which means "good, or true, whale of the ice".

The cladogram is a tool for visualizing and comparing the evolutionary relationships between taxa. The point where a node branches off is analogous to an evolutionary branching – the diagram can be read left-to-right, much like a timeline. The following cladogram of the family Balaenidae serves to illustrate the current scientific consensus as to the relationships between the North Atlantic right whale and the other members of its family.

Another so-called species of right whale, the "Swedenborg whale" as proposed by Emanuel Swedenborg in the 18th century, was by scientific consensus once thought to be the North Atlantic right whale. However, the 2013 results of DNA analysis of those fossil bones revealed that they were in fact those of the bowhead whale.

Whaling 

As the "right" whale continued to float long after being killed, it was possible to 'flense' or strip the whale of blubber without having to take it on board ship. Combined with the right whale's lack of speed through water, feeding habits, and coastal habitat, they were easy to catch, even for whalers equipped only with wooden boats and hand-held harpoons.

Basques were the first to commercially hunt this species. They began whaling in the Bay of Biscay as early as the eleventh century. The whales were hunted initially for whale oil, but, as meat preservation technology improved, their value as food increased. Basque whalers reached eastern Canada by 1530. The last Basque whaling voyages were made prior to the commencement of the Seven Years' War (1756–1763). A few attempts were made to revive the trade, but they failed. Shore whaling continued sporadically into the 19th century. It had previously been assumed that Basque whaling in eastern Canada had been the primary cause for the depletion of the sub-population in the western North Atlantic, but later genetic studies disproved this.

Setting out from Nantucket and New Bedford in Massachusetts and from Long Island, New York, Americans took up to one hundred right whales each year, with the records including one report of 29 whales killed in Cape Cod Bay in a single day during January 1700. By 1750, the North Atlantic right whale population was, for commercial purposes, depleted. Yankee whalers moved into the South Atlantic before the end of the 18th century. The population was so low by the mid-19th century that the famous Whitby whaler Rev. William Scoresby, son of the successful British whaler William Scoresby senior (1760–1829), claimed to have never seen a right whale (although he mainly hunted bowhead whales off eastern Greenland, outside the normal range of right whales).

Based on back calculations using the present population size and growth rate, the population may have numbered fewer than 100 individuals by 1935.  As it became clear that hunting right whales was unsustainable, international protection for right whales came into effect, as the practice was banned globally in 1937. The ban was largely successful, although violations continued for several decades. Madeira took its last two right whales in 1967. After the fall of the iron Curtain, it was discovered that from the 1950s to the 1970s the Soviet Whaling fleet had actually killed several thousand right whales, with little regard to the IWC's regulations. The actual numbers that were killed were kept a close secret, but the scandal came to light when Russian biologists stepped forward to correct data that had been misreported to the IWC.

Threats 
For the period 1970 to October 2006, humans have been responsible for 48% of the 73 documented deaths of the North Atlantic right whale.  A 2001 forecast showed a declining population trend in the late 1990s, and indicated a high probability that North Atlantic right whales would go extinct within 200 years if the then-existing anthropogenic mortality rate was not curtailed.  The combined factors of small population size and low annual reproductive rate of right whales mean that a single death represents a significant increase in mortality rate. Conversely, significant reduction in the mortality rate can be obtained by preventing just a few deaths.  It was calculated that preventing the deaths of just two females per year would enable the population to stabilize.  The data suggests, therefore, that human sources of mortality may have a greater effect relative to population growth rates of North Atlantic right whales than for other whales.   The principal factors known to be retarding growth and recovery of the population are ship strikes and entanglement with fishing gear.

Ship strikes 

The single greatest danger to this species is injury sustained from ship strikes. Between 1970 and October 2006, 37% of all recorded North Atlantic right whale deaths were attributed to collisions. During the years 1999–2003, incidents of mortality and serious injury attributed to ship strikes averaged 1 per year. For the years 2004–2006, that number increased to 2.6.  Additionally, it is possible that the official figures actually underestimate the actual ship-strike mortality rates, since whales struck in offshore areas may never be sighted due to low search effort.

In 2002, the International Maritime Organization shifted the location of the Traffic Separation Scheme (TSS, i.e. shipping lanes) in the Bay of Fundy (and approaches) from an area with the highest density of North Atlantic right whales to an area of lower density. This was the first time the IMO had changed a TSS to help protect marine mammals. In 2006, the US National Oceanic and Atmospheric Administration (NOAA) established a set of recommended vessel routes to reduce ship strikes in four important eastern-US right whale habitats. In 2007, and again on June 1, 2009, NOAA changed the TSS servicing Boston to reduce vessel collisions with right whales and other whale species. NOAA estimated that implementing an "Area To Be Avoided" (ATBA) and narrowing the TSS by  would reduce the relative risk of right whale ship strikes by 74% during April–July (63% from the ATBA and 11% from the narrowing of the TSS). In 2008, the National Marine Fisheries Service (NMFS) and NOAA enacted a series of vessel speed restrictions to reduce ship collisions with North Atlantic right whales for ships in certain areas along the East Coast of the United States in order to reduce the probability of fatal ship strikes.

Fishing gear entanglement 

The next greatest source of human-induced mortality is entanglement in fixed fishing gear such as bottom-set groundfish gillnet gear, cod traps and lobster pots.  Between 1970 and October 2006, there have been 8 instances where entanglements have been the direct cause of death of North Atlantic right whales.  This represents 11% of all deaths documented during that period.  From 1986 to 2005, there were a total of 61 confirmed reports of entanglements, including the aforementioned mortalities.  It is likely that official figures underestimate the actual impacts of entanglement.  It is believed that chronically entangled animals may in fact sink upon death, due to loss of buoyancy from depleted blubber reserves, and therefore escape detection.

According to a 2012 New England Aquarium report, 85 percent of the whales have had rope entanglement at least one time and it is the leading cause of death.

A whale that survives an entanglement episode may be weakened, have reduced fertility, or become vulnerable to further injury. Because whales often free themselves of gear following an entanglement event, scarring may be a better indicator of fisheries interaction than entanglement sightings. A 2012 analysis of the scarification of right whales over the years 1980 to 2009 showed that 82.9% of all North Atlantic right whales experienced at least one fishing gear entanglement, 59.0% have had more than one such experience, and an average of 15.5% of the population are entangled in fishing gear annually.

In 2007, so as to protect northern right whales from serious injury or mortality from entanglement in gillnet gear in their calving area in Atlantic Ocean waters off the southeast United States, the National Marine Fisheries Service (NMFS) revised regulations implementing the Atlantic Large Whale Take Reduction Plan (ALWTRP).  This plan expands the restricted area to include the waters off of South Carolina, Georgia, and Northern Florida. It also prohibits gillnet fishing or even gillnet possession in those waters for a period of five months, beginning on November 15 of each year, which coincides with the annual right whale calving season.

When entanglement prevention efforts fail, disentanglement efforts occasionally succeed, despite the fact that such efforts are more frequently impossible or unsuccessful.  Nevertheless, they do in fact make a significant difference because saving a few whales in a population of only 400 has a large positive effect against mortality rates. During the period 2004–2008 there were at least four documented cases of entanglements for which the intervention of disentanglement teams averted a likely death of a right whale. For the first time in 2009 and again in 2011, scientists successfully used chemical sedation of an entangled whale to reduce stress on the animal and to reduce the time spent working with it. After disentangling the whale, scientists attached a satellite tracking tag, administered a dose of antibiotics to treat entanglement wounds and then another drug to reverse the sedation. Despite concerns that the trauma might impair reproduction, researchers confirmed in January 2013 that three disentangled whales had given birth.

Due to recently increased presences of right whales in Cape Breton to St. Lawrence regions, increases in entanglements and possible ship strikes have been confirmed as well including serious fatal cases involving three whales between June 24 and July 13, 2015.

A female known as Snow Cone gained attention in September 2022 after being spotted off the coast of Massachusetts dragging fishing gear. The 17-year-old whale, who had been continuously entangled for at least 18 months, and was covered in lice and swimming slowly, was considered beyond saving by scientists.

In 2022, the Marine Stewardship Council revoked its certification for the commercial Gulf of Maine lobster fishery, citing risks of entanglement of North American right whales in lobster-fishing gear. The same year, Seafood Watch added the American and Canadian Maine lobster fisheries to its "red list" to seafood species to avoid, for the same reason. The MSC and Seafood Watch led some retailers to stop selling Maine lobster. The decision was welcomed by whale-conservation groups, but opposed by the Maine lobster industry and elected officials in Maine, where the fishery is economically important.

Noise 

A 2011 analysis of data collected in the Bay of Fundy has shown that exposure to low-frequency ship noise may be associated with chronic physiological stress in North Atlantic right whales.

Naval training near calving grounds 
The US Navy proposed plans to build a new undersea naval sonar training range immediately adjacent to northern right whale calving grounds in shallow waters off the Florida/Georgia border. In September 2012, legal challenges by 12 environmental groups were denied in federal court, allowing the Navy to proceed.

Climate change 
Climate change poses a threat to the North Atlantic right whale as global temperatures increase and ocean processes change. Long migratory periods, gestations, and time gaps between calves results in slow-growing right whale populations. A brief change in food availability (in particular Calanus finmarchicus) can affect right whale populations for years after. Females must have access to plenty of food to successfully make it through pregnancy and produce enough milk to rear a calf. To illustrate the species’ sensitivity to food availability, in 1998 zooplankton populations dropped dramatically following a climate shift. Even though zooplankton abundance began to rise again in 1999, right whales have such a long reproduction and migratory cycle that the population was greatly affected by the minimal food availability from the year before. In 1999, only one right whale calf was born, compared to the 21 that were born in 1996, before the climate shift. In 2001, after the zooplankton populations greatly recovered, 30 calves were born.

Zooplankton abundance has been found to be associated with the North Atlantic Oscillation (NAO), the most influential climate force in the Northern Hemisphere. Periodically, pressure anomalies in the system shift from positive to negative as determined by the NAO Index, affecting temperatures and wind patterns. Abundant zooplankton populations have been linked to a positive NAO Index. As global temperatures increase, the NAO is predicted to shift more often and to greater intensities (so-called marine heatwaves). These shifts will likely greatly affect the abundance of zooplankton, posing a great risk for right whale populations that cannot rapidly adapt to a new food source.

Climate change causes warming of the ocean, and in turn changes ocean circulation patterns. This changes the foraging patterns and habitat of the North Atlantic right whale, "reducing the population’s calving rate and exposing it to greater mortality risks from ship strikes and fishing gear entanglement".

2017 Unusual Mortality Event 
As defined by the Marine Mammal Protection Act an Unusual Mortality Event (UME) demands immediate response and is characterized by a stranding that is unexpected or involves a significant die-off of any marine mammal population. In 2017, a UME began in the North Atlantic right whale population. 2017 saw the population of under 400 suffer 17 deaths as a result of anthropogenic threats (12 in Canada, 5 in the U.S). In 2018 there were 3 deaths attributed to anthropogenic threats, and in 2019 another 10 were lost to such causes. 9 of the deaths were attributed to vessel strikes and 8 to entanglement with the rest lacking a thorough examination to determine the cause of death. The same time period (2017-2019) saw an additional 8 severely injured, as in they were observed in a condition that would likely kill them within weeks to months.

Population and distribution 
It is not known how many populations of North Atlantic right whales existed prior to whaling, but the majority of studies usually consider that there were historically two populations, one each in the eastern and western North Atlantic. There are however two other hypotheses which claim, respectively, one super-population among the entire North Atlantic (with mixing of eastern and western migratory routes occurring at locations in relatively high latitudes such as in the Denmark Strait), and three sub-populations of eastern, western, and central Atlantic right whales (with the central stock ranging from Greenland's Cape Farewell in summer to the Azores, Bermuda, and Bahamas in winter, although recent study indicates that the Azores had probably been a migratory corridor rather than a wintering ground).

Recent studies revealed that modern counterparts of the eastern and western populations are genetically much closer to each other than previously thought. Right whales' habitat can be affected dramatically by climate changes along with Bowhead whales.

Western population 

In spring, summer and autumn, the western North Atlantic population feeds in a range stretching from Massachusetts to Newfoundland. Particularly popular feeding areas are the Bay of Fundy, the Gulf of Maine and Cape Cod Bay. In winter, they head south towards Georgia and Florida to give birth. According to census of individual whales identified using photo-identification techniques, the latest available stock assessment data (August 2012) indicates that a minimum of 396 recognized individuals were known to be alive in the western North Atlantic in 2010, up from 361 in 2005. Distributions within other parts of Bay of Fundy is rather unknown, although whales are occasionally observed at various locations in northern parts such as in Baxters Harbour or at Campobello Island.

Though their numbers are still scarce, some right whales migrate regularly into the Gulf of St. Lawrence, notably around the Gaspé Peninsula and in the Chaleur Bay, and up to Anticosti Island, Tadoussac and in the St. Lawrence River such as at Rouge Island. Until 1994, whales were regarded as rather vagrant migrants into St. Lawrence region, however annual concentrations of whales were discovered off Percé in 1995 and sightings in entire St. Lawrence regions have been shown gradual increases since in 1998.  For example, in the survey conducted by the Canadian Whale Institute in 2006, three whales were detected off the peninsula. Some whales including cow and calf pairs also appear around Cape Breton Island with notable increasing regularities in recent years, notably since in 2014, and about 35 to 40 whales were confirmed around Prince Edward Island and Gaspe Peninsula in 2015. Further, the whales' regular range is known to reach up to off Newfoundland and the Labrador Sea, and several have been found in a former whaling ground east of Greenland's southern tip.

Parts of the western group, especially for those seen regularly in the Gulf of St. Lawrence, display different migratory or calving routines than other whales and these are so-called "Offshore Whales". There could be various areas along or off the west coasts where could have been frequented by whales potentially and might be re-colonized in the future such as Quoddy, Eastport, Plymouth Harbor, Sagamore Beach, Island of Nantucket, Florida Bay, Pamlico Sound, Gulf of Mexico (as far as to Texas), Bahamas, Long Island Sound and vicinity to New York City, the mouth of Potomac River, Delaware and Chesapeake Bay, the mouth of Altamaha River, Cape Canaveral, Sebastian Inlet and around Melbourne. As the population grows, it's also highly possible that more whales would start using rivers or river mouths, shallow estuaries, smaller inlets or bays. Whales have already seen repeatedly at various of these such as Indian River Inlet, Delaware River, Cape Cod Canal, and Jacksonville Drum.

In early 2009, scientists recorded a record number of births among the western North Atlantic population. 39 new calves were recorded, born off the Atlantic coast of Florida and Georgia:

In contrast, 2012 was the worst calving season since 2000, with only seven calves sighted – and one of those was believed to have died.  This is significantly below the annual average of 20 calves per year over the last decade.  As the gestation period for right whales is a year long, researchers believe that a lack of food in the whales' summer feeding grounds in the Bay of Fundy during the summer of 2010 may be linked to the poor season in 2012. The right whale was purported to have reached a population of 500 in the North Atlantic, which was assumed to have been achieved for the first time in centuries, when counted in 2013. The population of the whale has been increasing at about 2.5 percent per year, but this is below the optimal goal of 6 or 7 percent that researchers were hoping to attain.

There were 411 of these animals left in 2019, when calves were born after a barren 2018.

As of 2021, the population is estimated to be down to 350 whales.

Aerial and shipboard surveys are conducted annually to locate and record seasonal distribution of North Atlantic right whales along the northeast and southeast United States coast.  Researchers identify individual right whales, document whale behavior, monitor new calves, and respond to entangled whales. The surveys have been used to produce seasonal maps showing the density of right whales (number of animals per square kilometer) throughout the U.S. east coast and Nova Scotia. NOAA Fisheries maintains an interactive map of recent right whale sightings.

Eastern population 

In the eastern North Atlantic, the right whale population probably numbers in the low double digits at best, with little information known about their distribution and migration pattern. Scientists believe that this population may be functionally extinct. The last catch occurred in February 1967 from a pod of three animals including a cow-calf pair: one escaped in Madeira and one was taken in the Azores.

Cintra Bay and Bahia Gorrei, about 150 kilometers south of Villa Cisneros in the Western Sahara, the only known historical calving ground for this group, host no animals (or if any, then likely very few) nowadays, holding a situation similar to the Bay of Biscay area where many whales once congregated throughout years. Although there were several sightings in the late 20th century (see Bay of Biscay) and catch records indicate whales historically used the bay for both feeding and wintering, it is still unclear whether or not the Biscayne coasts were ever used as calving grounds. Other parts of coastlines or oceanic islands from Iberian Peninsula and Portugal to Morocco in north to south possibly reaching even Mauritania to Senegal. Locations such as Dakhla Peninsula and Bay of Arguin had been served potentially as wintering grounds similar to the Cintra and Gorrei Bays region. Historic presence of any summering or wintering grounds within the Mediterranean Basin including Black and Azov Sea is unknown although it has been considered to be feasible.

Entire European regions including French coasts, Hebrides, North and Baltic Seas, and further north up to Swedish, and Norwegian areas were once ranged by whales. Phenology of catch records in the early twentieth century in Nordic countries shows that whale presences in northern waters was at peak in June. In Ireland, catches were concentrated in the first half of June until 1930s and preceded catch in the Scottish bases of the Hebrides which were concentrated in the second half of June and July, and this indicates that those whales were likely to migrate along Irish coasts. Of all modern whaling grounds in European waters, Hebrides and the Shetland Islands were the center of whaling in the early 20th century, and any records afterwards these catches became scarce in eastern Atlantic where only two cow-calf pairs had been documented.

Any calm waters in north such as Porth Neigwl, the Wadden Sea region, Cornwall coasts, Moray Firth and in Irish Sea could have been migratory colliders/feeding or resting grounds, or seasonal habitats to stay for less-migrating or resident (fully or partially) individuals. Some might have reached to entrance of Baltic Sea and northern Scandinavian. Based on historical records, Scandinavian waters once had been a potential feeding area, and this idea corresponds with behaviors of the below mentioned vagrant individual "Porter" recorded in 1999 when he stayed in the fjord for several weeks, indicating the area provided to him a feasible condition for summering. Historical records suggest that summering grounds could have reached further north to northern coasts of Scandinavian Peninsula, and some might have turned up at the mouth of Hudson Bay.

Predicted summering range models suggest that small numbers of right whales could have been present year-round in the Mediterranean Sea although it is unclear whether whales ever penetrated Turkish Straits to Marmara, Black, and Azov Seas (historical presences at northern Aegean Sea were considered in this study which didn't include the northernmost basins in study areas).

Sightings and confirmations in recent years 

There have been a few sightings further east over the past few decades, with several sightings close to Iceland in 2003. There was speculation that these could be the remains of a virtually extinct Eastern Atlantic stock, but examination of old whalers' records suggest that they are more likely to be strays from further west. A few have been sighted in waters adjacent to Norway (two documented sightings in 1926 and 1999), Ireland, shelf waters west of Scotland, Irish Sea, the Bay of Biscay in Spain, off the Iberian Peninsula, a cow-calf pair at Cape St. Vincent in Portugal, and continuous sightings of a single animal off the southwestern Tenerife in the Canary Islands in 1995. Subsequently, there have been two more sightings in Benderlau, La Gomera and some other observations were reported in Portugal and Galicia. A whale of unknown species, thought to be a right whale, was seen off Steenbanken, Schouwen-Duiveland (Netherlands) in July 2005 and was possibly the same animal previously seen off Texel in the West Frisian Islands. Another possible sighting was made along Lizard Point, Cornwall in May 2012.

Few recent sightings have also been recorded from pelagic waters such as off Hebrides and on Rockall Basin as late as in 2000s.

Right whales have also on rare occasion been observed in the Mediterranean Sea. Since the two records of a stranding (Italy) and a capture of one of a pair seen (Algeria) in early 20th century, one sighting recorded in Dutch sighting scheme possibly between 1954 and 1957, only one possible sighting have been confirmed. Earlier known occurrences of right whales in the basin include the stranding of a juvenile near Taranto (southeastern Italy) in 1877 and the sighting of two (one of which was later captured) in the bay of Castiglione (Algiers) in 1888 and Portugal. The Norway sightings appear to be of vagrants, or strays from the western Atlantic stock.
Catch records at Cape Verde Islands in spring-summer seasons are highly doubtful.

Below is a list of some of recent records of right whales in eastern North Atlantic (not all of above-mentioned records and excluding vagrant records, according to the Spanish edition of this article). Records and confirmations close to Newfoundland, Iceland, and Cape Farewell are also excluded.

 * A male accompanied a cow-calf and only the male fled

Vagrants from the Western Population 

Some eastern sightings have been officially confirmed to be of vagrants from the western population. A right whale seen off Cape Cod in May 1999 was later seen in the Kvænangen fjord in Troms, Northern Norway in September 1999. This individual was later confirmed to be "Porter", an adult male in the catalog (No.1133). The area vicinity to Scandinavian Peninsula was once in the historical "North Cape Ground", one of the major whaling grounds for this species in the 17th century.

In January 2009, one animal was sighted off Pico Island, Azores, the first confirmed appearance there since 1888. This animal was later identified as a female from the western Atlantic group, and nicknamed as "Pico" according to this event.

Some individuals are known to show interesting patterns of movements which may possibly help researchers to deepen understandings of future re-colonization to eastern Atlantic, if possible.

Possible central population 
Several biologists have mentioned the possibility that a third population exists, which ranges from near Iceland or Greenland in the north to Bermuda or the Bahamas in the south. Some right whales are now said to live primarily in Icelandic waters, occasionally joining up with the western population. In July 2003, a research team from the New England Aquarium investigated the possibility of right whales inhabiting the Cape Farewell region. They recorded a sighting of a female right whale in the Irminger Sea, southwest of the Iceland coast. She was later named "Hidalgo" due to a scar mark on her head resembling a horse.

In 2009, right whales appeared in waters around Greenland although their origin was not confirmed. Prior to this, no right whales had been killed or confirmed present off the coast of Greenland for around 200 years except for the sighting of "1718",  a unique animal seen only twice (off Cape Farewell in July 1987 and at the Nova Scotian Shelf in June 1989). Several sightings in the area made in the 1970s may or may not be of right whales, as the critically endangered population of Bowhead whales are also present in the area.

For southward migration, the sighting of two whales displaying courtship behaviors in the Bermuda was recorded by a team of researchers including Roger Payne in April, 1970.

Conservation status 

In the United States, this species is listed as  “endangered” by the NMFS under the Endangered Species Act. It is also listed as  "depleted" under the Marine Mammal Protection Act.

In Canada the species is federally protected under the Species at Risk Act (SARA). Since entanglement in floating gear accounted for 82% of documented right whale deaths in 2022, the Canadian Wildlife Federation has been providing ropeless equipment to snow crab fishers in and around the Gulf of St Lawrence. 

On a global level, the Convention on the Conservation of Migratory Species of Wild Animals (CMS, or the "Bonn Convention") is a multilateral treaty specializing in the conservation of migratory species, their habitats and migration routes. CMS has listed the North Atlantic right whale on Appendix I, which identifies it as a migratory species threatened with extinction.  This obligates member nations to strive towards strict protection of these animals, habitat conservation or restoration, mitigation of obstacles to migration, and control of other factors that might endanger them.

Additionally, CMS encourages concerted action among the range states of many Appendix I species. To that end, a small portion of the eastern Atlantic population's range is covered by the Agreement on the Conservation of Cetaceans in the Black Sea, Mediterranean Sea and Contiguous Atlantic Area (ACCOBAMS).  The Atlantic area bounded on the west by a line running from Cape St. Vincent in southwest Portugal to Casablanca, Morocco, and on the east by the Straight of Gibraltar.

Another multilateral treaty, the Convention on International Trade in Endangered Species of Wild Fauna and Flora, (CITES, or the “Washington Convention”), also lists the North Atlantic right whale on its own Appendix I. Being so listed prohibits international trade (import or export) in specimens of this species or any derivative products (e.g. food or drug products, bones, trophies), except for scientific research and other exceptional cases with a permit specific to that specimen.

Whale watching 

Either land based or organized whale watching activities are available along east coasts from Canada in north to Virginia, North Carolina, Georgia, Florida to south. Stellwagen Bank Sanctuary has also been designated for watching this species. Onlookers lucky enough can spot them from shores time to time on whales' migration seasons especially for feeding (vicinity to Cape Cod such as at Race Point and Brier Island), and breeding/calving (off Georgia to Florida coasts) when whales strongly approach shores or enters rivers or estuaries such as at Outer Banks, Pamlico Sound, Indian River Inlet, Cape Lookout, Virginia Beach, Virginia, Golden Isles of Georgia, beaches on Florida (e.g. most notably at Flagler, Jacksonville, St. Augustine, Ponte Vedra, Satellite, Crescent, and Cocoa, and any others like Ormond, New Smyrna, South Melbourne, Wrightsville, Vero), Boynton, and so on. There are some piers used for lookout points such as at Jacksonville and Wrightsville.

With their low profile on the water, right whales can be difficult to spot, so all fishermen and boaters transiting through potential right whale habitat should keep a sharp lookout. Boaters should be advised that NOAA Fisheries has a "500-yard rule", prohibiting anyone from approaching within  of a North Atlantic right whale.  The regulations include all boaters, fishing vessels (except commercial fishing vessel retrieving gear), kayakers, surfers, and paddleboarders, and agencies such as the United States Coast Guard and the Massachusetts Environmental Police have been authorized to enforce it.

Right whale sightings can be valuable to researchers, who recommend all sightings be reported. In Florida, the Marine Resources Council maintains a volunteer sighting network to receive sighting information from the public and verify sightings with trained volunteers.

Due to the species' status, as of 2014, there is no whale watching location in eastern and mid Atlantic, and oceanic islands feasible to observe right whales regularly. Among these, only off Iceland right whales have been encountered during watching tours (save for expeditions and land-based observations targeting for birds and other faunas), and several observations were made in Iceland during the 2000s.

See also 

List of Georgia state symbols
List of South Carolina state symbols
List of mammals of Massachusetts (Right whale is the State Marine Animal)
List of mammals of Georgia (U.S. state)
List of marine mammal species
List of cetaceans
Moira Brown

References

External links 

 North Atlantic Right Whale Consortium
 North Atlantic Right Whale Research at the New England Aquarium
 Digital North Atlantic Right Whale Catalog by New England Aquarium
 North Atlantic Right Whale species information at the Smithsonian Ocean Portal
 NOAA – National Marine Fisheries Service – North Atlantic Right Whale
 Hear right whale audio (U. of R.I., Office of Marine Programs)
 Watch video of northern right whales
 Provincetown Center for Coastal Studies – Whale Rescue / Disentanglement
 Right Whale Listening Network has acoustic autobuoys in between the lanes of the Traffic Separation Scheme approaching Boston.
 Smithsonian Institution – North American Mammals: Eubalaena glacialis
 Voices in the Sea – Sounds of the North Atlantic Right Whale
 The MORSE project – North Atlantic right whale: recent summer records outside main grounds
 Humans pushing North Atlantic right whale to extinction faster than believed. The Guardian, October 30, 2020.
 Animal activists say Senate omnibus bill condemns right whale to extinction. The Guardian, December 1, 2022.

Balaenidae
Endangered animals
Cetaceans of the Atlantic Ocean
Mammals of North America
Mammals of the United States
Mammals of Canada
Mammals of Europe
Baleen whales
ESA endangered species
Mammals described in 1776